"Blue in Green" is the third tune on Miles Davis' 1959 album, Kind of Blue.  One of two ballads on the LP (the other being "Flamenco Sketches"), the melody of "Blue in Green" is very modal, incorporating the presence of the Dorian, Mixolydian, and Lydian modes. This is the only tune on which Cannonball Adderley sits out.

Background
It has long been speculated that pianist Bill Evans wrote "Blue in Green", even though the LP and most jazz fakebooks credit only Davis with its composition. In his autobiography, Davis maintains that he alone composed the pieces on Kind of Blue. The version on Evans' trio album Portrait in Jazz, recorded in 1959, credits the tune to "Davis-Evans". Earl Zindars, in an interview conducted by Win Hinkle, stated that "Blue in Green" was indeed "100-percent Bill's." In a radio interview broadcast on May 27, 1979, Evans himself said that he had written the piece. On being asked about the issue by interviewer Marian McPartland, he said: "The truth is I did [write the music]... I don't want to make a federal case out of it, the music exists, and Miles is getting the royalties...."  Evans alleged that when he suggested that he was entitled to a share of the royalties, Davis wrote him a check for $25.

In a recording made in December 1958 or January 1959 for Chet Baker's album Chet (prior to the Kind of Blue sessions), Evans' introduction on the jazz standard "Alone Together" has been directly compared to his playing on "Blue in Green".

Personnel
 Miles Davis – trumpet
 John Coltrane – tenor saxophone
 Bill Evans – piano
 Paul Chambers – double bass
 Jimmy Cobb – drums

References 

1959 compositions
Compositions by Miles Davis
Jazz compositions in D minor